Władysław Pawłowski (19 August 1915 – 1 July 1992) was a Polish footballer. He played in two matches for the Poland national football team in 1937.

References

External links
 

1915 births
1992 deaths
Polish footballers
Poland international footballers
Place of birth missing
Association footballers not categorized by position